The National Archaeological Museum of Basilicata is an archaeological museum located in Potenza, Italy. It is located at the Palazzo Loffredo and holds objects discovered from excavations in the surrounding territory. It is dedicated to archaeologist Dinu Adameșteanu.

The museum provides a general overview of the archaeological finds of the region of Basilicata. The exhibition  follows a chronological and geographical order.

Some excavated items

References

External links
Official website

Archaeological museums in Italy
Buildings and structures in the Province of Potenza
Museums in Basilicata